Sree Moola Vilasam Government Model Higher Secondary School (popularly known as SMV School) is one among the oldest Schools in Kerala, Thiruvananthapuram (Trivandrum)
Established by Travancore Maharaja for English Education.

Sree Moola Vilasom Government Model Higher Secondary School, one of the best Schools in Trivandrum. This school was built by Tranvancore Maharaja Sree Swathi Thirunal and is one of the oldest school in Kerala Established in 1836. The buildings of the school was once used as the Commissioner Office. The fine architecture of British is one of its kind that provides natural aeration and lighting.

The school has an active National Service Scheme unit which is the best unit in Trivandrum which initiates social activities. The unit has also won the award of the state government for the best NSS unit of the city.

The position of the school near the downtown helps the people from all parts of the city.

Alumni 
 Dr. N. R. Madhava Menon, Legal educator 
 Dr. R. Kesavan Nair, Medical Academician 
 M. K. K. Nair, Bureaucrat
 Dr. P. K. Iyengar, Scientist, Padma Bhushan Winner
 Madhu (actor), Veteran Actor in Indian Film Industry
 G. Shankar, Architect

External links
http://www.smv.edu/
http://www.schoolwiki.in/index.php/എസ്.എം.വി_മോഡല്‍_എച്ച്.എസ്._എസ്_തിരുവനന്തപുരം
https://www.thehindu.com/news/cities/Thiruvananthapuram/temple-of-learning/article5075594.ece

High schools and secondary schools in Thiruvananthapuram